Yokuts Valley (formerly Squaw Valley) is a census-designated place located in Fresno County, California, at the foothills of the Sierra Nevada on State Route 180 just below Kings Canyon National Park. 

As of the 2010 census, the CDP had a total population of 3,162, up from 2,691 at the 2000 census.

Name
The label "Valley" originally referred to either the surrounding basin or a narrow valley that connects it to the San Joaquin Valley. Today it refers to both. The basin may have originally been named "Woman's Land", after a depression in a rock overlooking the valley that resembles a woman's moccasin print. By 1873, non-native hunters adapted the name in English to "Squaw Valley", because "squaw" was the pejorative term used by white settlers for Indigenous women. The United States Board on Geographic Names (BGN) officially assigned the name Squaw Valley to the community in 1957 and to the basin in 1959.

On August 28, 1958, at the behest of Representative B. F. Sisk, the BGN decided that Squaw Valley would only refer to this community, not to a newer community in Placer County that was about to host the 1960 Winter Olympics. The latter would become known as Olympic Valley. Nevertheless, the name "Squaw Valley" continued to refer informally to both communities, creating considerable confusion.

From 2020 to 2023, a coalition that included members of local tribes petitioned the Fresno County Board of Supervisors to rename the community "Nuum Valley" and later "Yokuts Valley", citing the derogatory history of the town's previous name.

In September 2022, the Board on Geographic Names renamed the surrounding valley to Yokuts Basin as part of a program to remove "squaw" from geographical names across the country. A Fresno County Supervisor, Republican Nathan Magsig, solicited feedback from 1,400 households soliciting feedback about the proposed renaming and organized a town hall meeting with local activists that turned contentious. Arguments against the name change ranged from procedural to political. Some opposed it simply for the fact that the new name had not been chosen by residents. Others refused to accept that the word "squaw" has a derogatory history, and proposed that "a woke agenda" had motivated the change. Arguments in favor of the change came from Native activists and white residents of the town who wanted their home cleared of a name that degraded Indigenous women.

A few days later, Governor Gavin Newsom signed a law directing state and local authorities to remove "squaw" from geographic features and place names throughout the state, including Squaw Valley, by 2025. In October, the Fresno County Board of Supervisors passed a resolution that acknowledged the state and federal renaming efforts while notifying the federal government that 87% of households that responded to Supervisor Magsig's survey opposed renaming the community.

In January 2023, the Board on Geographic Names completed additional review on renaming the unincorporated populated place to "Yokuts Valley." In February, a prominent welcome sign bearing the previous name was removed, prompting some local residents to call for its restoration.

History
Present-day Yokuts Valley was originally the home of Yokuts and Mono people. In 1869, the Simpson Drake family became the first known non-native family to settle in the basin. An early reference to Yokuts Valley appears in an 1884 issue of an Idaho newspaper.

The first post office opened in Squaw Valley in 1879. It was renamed Squawvalley in 1895 before closing in 1918. It reopened in 1923, renamed back to Squaw Valley in 1932, and closed again in 1945 in favor of the nearby Orange Cove post office. The Squaw Valley post office was established a third time in 1960.

In the 1960s, the community moved east to its current location. In 1994, the Fresno County Public Library's Bear Mountain Branch Library relocated to the community from Dunlap, where it had been since 1915.

Geography
The community is located in the Yokuts Basin. The Squaw Valley-Miramonte AVA grape-growing region is centered around the community.

Demographics

2010
At the 2010 census Squaw Valley had a population of 3,162. The racial makeup of Squaw Valley was 2,700 (85.4%) White, 30 (0.9%) African American, 77 (2.4%) Native American, 47 (1.5%) Asian, 2 (0.1%) Pacific Islander, 159 (5.0%) from other races, and 147 (4.6%) from two or more races. Hispanic or Latino of any race were 525 people (16.6%).

The census reported that 3,160 people (99.9% of the population) lived in households, 2 (0.1%) lived in non-institutionalized group quarters, and no one was institutionalized.

There were 1,188 households, 343 (28.9%) had children under the age of 18 living in them, 715 (60.2%) were married couples living together, 101 (8.5%) had a female householder with no husband present, 66 (5.6%) had a male householder with no wife present. There were 75 (6.3%) unmarried opposite-sex partnerships, and 7 (0.6%) same-sex married couples or partnerships. 239 households (20.1%) were one person and 99 (8.3%) had someone living alone who was 65 or older. The average household size was 2.66. There were 882 families (74.2% of households); the average family size was 3.01.

The age distribution was 709 people (22.4%) under the age of 18, 200 people (6.3%) aged 18 to 24, 597 people (18.9%) aged 25 to 44, 1,111 people (35.1%) aged 45 to 64, and 545 people (17.2%) who were 65 or older. The median age was 46.3 years. For every 100 females, there were 103.2 males. For every 100 females age 18 and over, there were 99.9 males.

There were 1,419 housing units at an average density of 25.1 per square mile (9.7/km),of which 1,188 were occupied, 1,009 (84.9%) by the owners and 179 (15.1%) by renters.  The homeowner vacancy rate was 3.6%; the rental vacancy rate was 5.7%. 2,648 people (83.7% of the population) lived in owner-occupied housing units and 512 people (16.2%) lived in rental housing units.

2000
As of the census of 2000, there were 2,691 people, 1,025 households, and 779 families in the CDP. There were 1,160 housing units at an average density of 20.5 per square mile (7.9/km). The racial makeup of the CDP was 88.33% White, 1.37% African American, 2.38% Native American, 0.56% Asian, 0.22% Pacific Islander, 4.83% from other races, and 2.30% from two or more races. 12.15% of the population were Hispanic or Latino of any race.

Of the 1,025 households 26.5% had children under the age of 18 living with them, 63.9% were married couples living together, 8.2% had a female householder with no husband present, and 24.0% were non-families. 19.3% of households were one person and 8.7% were one person aged 65 or older. The average household size was 2.62 and the average family size was 2.98.

The age distribution was 23.5% under the age of 18, 5.6% from 18 to 24, 23.7% from 25 to 44, 30.9% from 45 to 64, and 16.3% 65 or older. The median age was 44 years. For every 100 females, there were 97.3 males. For every 100 females age 18 and over, there were 97.4 males.

The median household income was $39,417 and the median family income  was $47,739. Males had a median income of $38,375 versus $27,850 for females. The per capita income for the CDP was $20,719. 8.9% of the population and 2.6% of families were below the poverty line. 14.4% of those under the age of 18 and 2.1% of those 65 and older were living below the poverty line.

Government
As an unincorporated community, Yokuts Valley lacks a local government. Instead, Fresno County service areas and special districts serve the area. Along with much of eastern Fresno County, Yokuts Valley is located in Supervisorial District 5. The Kings Canyon Unified School District serves Fresno County's mountain areas including Yokuts Valley. The Fresno County Sheriff's Office maintains a substation in Yokuts Valley.

Notable people
 Stuart Erwin actor
 Don Knight actor

References

External links

Census-designated places in Fresno County, California
Populated places established in 1879
Census-designated places in California